Winston Churchill formed the third Churchill ministry in the United Kingdom after the 1951 general election. He was reappointed as Prime Minister of the United Kingdom by King George VI and oversaw the accession of Queen Elizabeth II in 1952 and her coronation.

History

The Conservative Party returned to power in the United Kingdom after winning the 1951 general election following six years in opposition. This was the first majority Conservative government formed since Stanley Baldwin's 1924–1929 ministry. Winston Churchill became Prime Minister for a second time. Churchill's government had several prominent figures and up-and-coming stars. Rab Butler was appointed as Chancellor of the Exchequer while Sir Anthony Eden returned as Foreign Secretary. The noted Scottish lawyer Sir David Maxwell Fyfe, who had gained fame as a prosecutor at the Nuremberg Trials, became Home Secretary. He remained in this post until 1954, when he was ennobled as Viscount Kilmuir and appointed Lord Chancellor. Future Conservative Prime Minister Harold Macmillan achieved his first major Cabinet position when he was made Minister of Defence in 1954.

Gwilym Lloyd George, younger son of former Liberal Party leader and Prime Minister David Lloyd George, replaced Sir David Maxwell Fyfe as Home Secretary in 1954. Florence Horsbrugh became the first woman to hold a Cabinet post in a Conservative government when she was appointed Minister of Education in 1951. Several figures who were later to achieve high offices held their first governmental posts. These included: future Conservative Prime Minister Edward Heath, future Chancellors of the Exchequer Reginald Maudling, Peter Thorneycroft and Iain Macleod and future Foreign Secretary Lord Carrington. Other notable figures in the government were: John Profumo, Bill Deedes, David Ormsby-Gore and the Fifth Marquess of Salisbury.

The Churchill ministry was mainly concerned with international affairs, the widening Cold War and decolonialisation (especially the Mau Mau Uprising and the Malayan Emergency).

Despite suffering a stroke in 1953, Churchill remained in office until April 1955, when he resigned at the age of eighty. He was succeeded by his ambitious protégé and deputy, Sir Anthony Eden, who finally reached the post he had coveted for so long; although his premiership was to last for less than two years.

1955 cabinet

 Sir Winston Churchill – Prime Minister
 The Viscount Kilmuir – Lord High Chancellor of Great Britain
 The Marquess of Salisbury – Leader of the House of Lords and Lord President of the Council 
 Harry Crookshank – Leader of the House of Commons and Lord Keeper of the Privy Seal 
 Rab Butler – Chancellor of the Exchequer
 Sir Anthony Eden – Secretary of State for Foreign Affairs
 Gwilym Lloyd George – Secretary of State for the Home Department and Secretary of State for Welsh Affairs
 Derick Heathcoat-Amory – Minister of Agriculture, Fisheries and Food
 Alan Lennox-Boyd – Secretary of State for the Colonies
 The Viscount Swinton – Secretary of State for Commonwealth Relations
 Harold Macmillan – Minister of Defence
 Sir David Eccles – Minister of Education
 Duncan Sandys – Minister of Housing and Local Government
 Sir Walter Monckton – Minister of Labour and National Service
 The Earl of Woolton – Chancellor of the Duchy of Lancaster and Minister of Materials
 Osbert Peake – Minister of Pensions
 James Stuart – Secretary of State for Scotland
 Peter Thorneycroft – President of the Board of Trade
 Norman Brook – Cabinet Secretary

List of ministers
Members of the Cabinet are in bold face.

References 

1950s in the United Kingdom
1951 establishments in the United Kingdom
1955 disestablishments in the United Kingdom
British ministries
Cabinets disestablished in 1955
Cabinets established in 1951
Government
Ministers in the third Churchill government, 1951–1955
Ministries of Elizabeth II
Ministries of George VI
Ministry 3